Habersham may refer to:

People
 James Habersham (1712–1775), British merchant, colonial official and advocate of slavery in the North American colony of Georgia
 James Habersham Jr. (1745–1799), American merchant and Speaker of the Georgia General Assembly, son of James 
 John Habersham (1754–1799), American merchant, planter, politician and Continental Army officer, son of James
 Joseph Habersham (1751–1815), American businessman, politician, Continental Army soldier and Postmaster General of the United States, son of James
 Richard Parnell Habersham, American actor
 Richard W. Habersham (1786–1842), American lawyer and politician

Places in the United States
 Habersham, Tennessee, an unincorporated community
 Habersham County, Georgia

Surnames of British Isles origin